Raees Coffee is an Iranian coffeehouse chain based in Tehran. The company was founded in 2000, and currently has ten branches, and a roastery in Iran.

See also
 List of coffeehouse chains

References

External links

Coffeehouses and cafés
Food and drink companies of Iran
Iranian companies established in 2000
Food and drink companies established in 2000